United States of Horror is the debut studio album by American hip hop group Ho99o9. It was released in May 2017 under Deathkult Records.

Tracklist

Accolades

References

2017 debut albums
Ho99o9 albums